Zachary Bookman (born 1980) is an American government technology entrepreneur. He is co-founder and CEO of OpenGov, a company that sells cloud software to local governments and state agencies. Prior to founding OpenGov, Bookman served as Advisor to the Anti‑Corruption Task Force in Kabul, Afghanistan.

Education 

Bookman holds a JD from the Yale Law School and an MPA from the Harvard Kennedy School. He graduated as valedictorian of his class from the University of Maryland and is an alumnus of the Sidwell Friends School in Washington, D.C. In 2007-2008, Bookman received a Fulbright Fellowship to study transparency and corruption in Mexico.

Career 
Bookman served as a law clerk to the Honorable Sandra S. Ikuta on the U.S. Court of Appeals for the Ninth Circuit, later working as a trial litigator at Keker, Van Nest & Peters in San Francisco.

Bookman served as Advisor to U.S. Army General H.R. McMaster (2011-2012), on the Combined Joint Interagency Task Force (Shafafiyat) at the International Security Assistance Force headquarters in Kabul, Afghanistan.  Bookman helped lead a Rule of Law team on the task force that worked with the Afghan Department of Justice on corruption cases, such as the bribery scandal at the Dawood National Military Hospital.

Bookman co-founded OpenGov in 2012 with Joe Lonsdale and Stanford University technologists. OpenGov received investments from Thrive Capital starting in 2013, and in 2017 Bookman participated in a White House summit organized by Jared Kushner, the brother of Thrive Capital's founder. In 2021 Bookman took a cross-country bike ride from the San Francisco Bay to the Chesapeake Bay to visit with local government leaders.

Personal life 
Bookman grew up in Cabin John, Maryland.

In September 2019, Bookman joined an expedition with mountain guide Garrett Madison to attempt a late season ascent of Mount Everest. Madison called off the attempt while the group was in base camp, which Madison described as a decision based on dangerous conditions. In March 2020, Bookman filed a lawsuit against Madison seeking damages over the non-refundable expedition fee, alleging that Madison had canceled the trip for reasons unrelated to safety. In December 2021, Bookman and Madison settled the lawsuit without a refund.

References 

1980 births
Living people
University of Maryland, College Park alumni
Yale Law School alumni
Harvard Kennedy School alumni